Lutetium(III) chloride or lutetium trichloride is the chemical compound composed of lutetium and chlorine with the formula LuCl3. It forms hygroscopic white monoclinic crystals and also a hydroscopic hexahydrate LuCl3·6H2O. Anhydrous lutetium(III) chloride has the YCl3 (AlCl3) layer structure with octahedral lutetium ions.

Reactions
Pure lutetium metal can be produced from lutetium(III) chloride by heating it together with elemental calcium:
2 LuCl3 + 3 Ca → 2 Lu + 3 CaCl2

See also

 Lutetium (177Lu) chloride

References

Lutetium compounds
Chlorides
Lanthanide halides